Acanthomenia is a genus of solenogasters, shell-less, worm-like, marine mollusks.

Species
 Acanthomenia arcuata Scheltema, 1999
 Acanthomenia gaussiana Thiele, 1913

References

 Thiele, J. (1913). Antarktische Solenogastren. Dtsch. Sübpolar Expedition 14. Zool. 6(1): 35-65.
 García-Álvarez O., Salvini-Plawen L.v., Urgorri V. & Troncoso J.S. (2014). Mollusca. Solenogastres, Caudofoveata, Monoplacophora. Fauna Iberica. 38: 1-294

External links
 Gil-Mansilla, E., Garcia-Alvarez, O. & Urgorri, V. 2008. New Acanthomeniidae (Solenogastres, Cavibelonia) from the abyssal Angola Basin. In: Martinez Arbizu, P. & Brix, S. (Eds) Bringing Light into Deep-sea Biodiversity. Zootaxa, 1866: 175- 186

Solenogastres